Isla Pitahaya is an island in Bahía Concepción near Playa Santispac, in Baja California Sur. The island's name is derived from the fact that the island has many tall pitahaya cacti that are clearly observable from afar. Isla Pitahaya also has a lighthouse. The southwest shore has a small white, sandy beach while the rest of the island is rocky.

References 

Islands of Baja California Sur
Nature reserves in Mexico
Islands of the Gulf of California
Uninhabited islands of Mexico